Valentinus Otho (also Valentin Otto; born around 1545–46 possibly in Magdeburg – 8 April 1603 in Heidelberg) was a German mathematician and astronomer.

Life 

In 1575 he supported Georg Joachim Rheticus in his trigonometric tables. The next year they went to Kaschau in Hungary where Rheticus died. Thus, Otho inherited the De revolutionibus manuscript of Nicolaus Copernicus that Rheticus had published in 1543 in Nuremberg.

Otho became Professor for mathematics in Wittenberg, but when the rulers of Saxony did not support the tables, he moved to Heidelberg where Elector Friedrich IV sponsored the '’Opus Palatinum de Triangulis’’ in 1596.

Work 
 Opus Palatinum de Triangulis, 1596 (original manuscript available online)
 De triangulis globi sine angulo recto libri quinque

External links 
 Cantor, Moritz: Vorlesungen über die Geschichte der Mathematik 1550-1600 Kapitel 68
 .

1603 deaths
16th-century German mathematicians
16th-century German astronomers
Year of birth uncertain
Thomaskantors
16th-century German writers
16th-century German male writers